Jungle Mahals, ( jungle estates) was a district formed by British possessions and some independent chiefdoms lying between Birbhum, Bankura, Midnapore and the hilly country of Chota Nagpur in what is now the Indian state of West Bengal. The district was located in the area known as the Jungle Terry.

History
The vagueness of the jurisdiction caused inconvenience. In 1805, Regulation XVIII was passed whereby the areas known as Jungle Mahals was separated from the jurisdiction of the Magistrates of the districts of Burdwan, Birbhum, Bankura and Midnapore and placed under a Magistrate of Jungle Mahals. The district thus formed was composed of 23 parganas and mahals.

By Regulation XIII of 1833, the district of Jungle Mahals was broken up. The estates of Senpahari, Shergarh and Bishnupur were transferred to Burdwan District and the remainder constituted the Manbhum District.

The area of Bankura, Purulia and West Midnapore and Jhargram districts of West Bengal is still colloquially referred to as "Jungle Mahal".

Statehood Demand
In 2021, Saumitra Khan, Lok Sabha BJP MP demanded the creation of Junglemahal state consisting of Purulia, Jhargram, Bankura, parts of Birbhum, Purbo Medinipur, Paschim Medinipur and along with some other areas. He claimed that the Junglemahal area is least development and the demands of employment and development for locals could be met only if it gets statehood. 

The West Bengal state BJP unit, however, distanced itself from the Junglemahal statehood demand. A Trinamool congress leader filed Complaint against Saumitra Khan for demanding statehood for Junglemahal.

See also
Chhota Nagpur Division
Jungle Terry

References

External links
The Jungle and the Aroma of Meats: An Ecological Theme in Hindu Medicine

Bengal Presidency
Districts of British India
1805 establishments in British India